The 36th Biathlon World Championships were held in 2001 for the second time in Pokljuka, Slovenia.

Men's results

20 km individual

10 km sprint

12.5 km pursuit

15 km mass start

4 × 7.5 km relay

Women's results

15 km individual

7.5 km sprint

10 km pursuit

12.5 km mass start

4 × 7.5 km relay

Medal table

References

2001
Biathlon World Championships
International sports competitions hosted by Slovenia
2001 in Slovenian sport
February 2001 sports events in Europe
Biathlon competitions in Slovenia